This is the list of cathedrals in  the Central African Republic.

Roman Catholic
Cathedrals of the Roman Catholic Church in the Central African Republic:
 Cathedral of the Sacred Heart in Alindao
 Cathedral of St. Joseph in Bambari
 Cathedral of St. Peter Claver in Bangassou
 Cathedral of Our Lady of the Immaculate Conception in Bangui
 Cathedral in Berbérati
 Cathedral of St. Anthony of Padua in Bossangoa
Cathédrale Saint Joseph in Bouar
 Cathedral of St. Therese of the Child Jesus in Kaga-Bandoro
 Cathedral of St. Joan of Arc in Mbaïki

See also

List of cathedrals
Baptist Churches of the Central African Republic

References

Catholic Church in the Central African Republic
Churches in the Central African Republic
Central African Republic
Cathedrals
Cathedrals